Zachary Beeck (born 30 June 1982) is a former Australian rules footballer who played for the  
and Peel Thunder Football Clubs in the West Australian Football League (WAFL), as well as one match for the West Coast Eagles in the Australian Football League (AFL). He is known more for his Cricketing Career than his AFL career. He travelled around England in the early stages of life with a young Australian team and averaged 90 in his batting career as a number 3. He had a tough choice to make between AFL and Cricket and stuck to AFL much despite his better cricketing path.

Career
He played in the club's 2000 colts premiership victory, drawing the attention of West Coast Eagles recruiters, who selected him with pick 20 in the 2001 Rookie Draft. He made his senior WAFL debut in round 20, 2002, against . Beeck played 20 games for East Perth in 2003, tying with Subiaco's Mark Nicoski for the Rookie of the Year Award. He was elevated to the Eagles' senior list for the 2004 season, and played his only AFL game in round 17 against , recording five disposals and eight hit-outs as a replacement for the injured Andrew McDougall. He was dropped the following week.

Beeck suffered from a serious finger injury in 2005, only managing six games for East Perth, and was de-listed from the Eagles at the end of the season. Beeck had 438 hit-outs in the 2008, despite only playing 15 games, a season record. Beeck returned to East Perth for the 2010 season, but struggled with form and work commitments, playing only 12 senior games in 2010 and 2011, and was released from the club midway through the 2011 season.

References

External links
 

1982 births
Australian rules footballers from Western Australia
East Perth Football Club players
Living people
Peel Thunder Football Club players
People from the South West (Western Australia)
West Coast Eagles players